Federico Alonso Tellechea (born August 15, 1981 in Buenos Aires) is a Spanish sailor.

Alonso won the Cadet class World Championships in 1998. In the 49er class, he won the silver medal at the 2008 European Championships, the gold medal at the 2009 ISAF Sailing World Cup, and the bronze medal at the 2015 World Championships.

References

External links
Official website

1981 births
49er class sailors
Living people
Real Club Astur de Regatas sailors
Spanish male sailors (sport)
Sportspeople from Gijón
Sportspeople from Buenos Aires
Argentine emigrants to Spain
Argentine male sailors (sport)
Cadet class world champions